UPC may refer to:

Companies
 UPC Broadband, a European provider of cable television, telephone and broadband content owned by Liberty Global
 UPC Magyarország, Hungary
 UPC Switzerland, TV, radio, Internet, telephone provider in Switzerland
UPC Poland, TV, Internet, telephone provider in Poland
 Uranium Participation Corporation, an Ontario-based holding company
 United Pictures Corporation, a mid-1960s American film production company

Institutions
 Polytechnic University of Catalonia (Universitat Politècnica de Catalunya), Barcelona
 Pilot University of Colombia (Universidad Piloto de Colombia)
 Peruvian University of Applied Sciences (Universidad Peruana de Ciencias Aplicadas)
 University of Plymouth Colleges network
 University of the Philippines Cebu
 University Park Campus, Nottingham
 China University of Petroleum (Huadong)
 Uganda People's Congress
 Union for Peace in the Central African Republic
 Union of the Peoples of Cameroon (Union des Populations du Cameroun)
 Union of Congolese Patriots
 United Party of Canada
 United Poultry Concerns

Law
 Unified Patent Court, a common patent court being, as of May 2022, in preparation in Europe
 Uniform Probate Code

Religion
 Universal Pentecostal Church, also known as The Pentecostal Mission
 United Pentecostal Church International
 United Presbyterian Church (disambiguation)

Technology
 Universal Product Code, a barcode symbology
 Unified Parallel C, a programming language
 Uniform Plumbing Code
 Uplink Power Control
 Usage Parameter Control, in Asynchronous Transfer Mode networks
 Unique Porting Code, for mobile number portability in India

Other uses
 UPC-Arena, an association football stadium in Austria